Center City or Centre City may refer to:

Places
 Center City, Minnesota, U.S.
Center City Historic District
 Center City, Allentown, Pennsylvania, U.S.
 Center City, Erie, Pennsylvania U.S.
 Center City, Harrisburg, Pennsylvania, U.S.
 Center City, Philadelphia, Pennsylvania U.S.
 Center City, Pittsburgh, Pennsylvania U.S.
 Center City, or Uptown Charlotte, North Carolina, U.S.

Other uses
 Centre City Building, Dayton, Ohio, U.S.
 Center City High School in Escondido, California
 Center City Mall
 Centre City Mall, Dunedin, New Zealand

See also

 Central city
 Citi Centre (disambiguation)
 City Center (disambiguation)
 Centre City Tower (disambiguation)
 
 
 
 
 Center (disambiguation), including centre
 City (disambiguation)